David Vincent Hayes (March 15, 1931 – April 9, 2013) was an American sculptor.

Life
Hayes received a Bachelor of Arts degree from the University of Notre Dame in 1953, and a M.F.A. degree from Indiana University in 1955 where he studied with David Smith.

He received a post-doctoral Fulbright Award and a Guggenheim Fellowship. He was a recipient of the Logan Medal of the Arts for Sculpture and an award from the National Institute of Arts and Letters. During his life, he had over 400 exhibitions and his work is included in some 100 institutional collections including those of the Museum of Modern Art and the Guggenheim Museum in New York City.

In 2007, he was conferred an honorary Doctor of Humane Letters degree by Albertus Magnus College.

Hayes resided in Coventry, Connecticut, where he had 54 acres of land to exhibit his works on the grounds of the David Hayes Sculpture Fields, an open air art museum open to the public. He died of leukemia at his home there on April 9, 2013.  He was 82.

In 2021, Hayes' work and grounds were the subject of an hour-long television broadcast shown on some 200 PBS stations nationwide produced by Legacy List with Matt Paxton.

Work in public collections

Source: David Hayes Art Foundation archives
Museum of Modern Art; New York City
Solomon R. Guggenheim Museum; New York City
Hirshhorn Museum and Sculpture Garden
Addison Gallery of American Art; Andover, Massachusetts
Currier Museum of Art; Manchester, New Hampshire
Musée des Arts Décoratifs; Paris
Detroit Institute of Arts; Detroit, Michigan
Museum of Fine Arts; Houston, Texas
Chase Manhattan Bank, N.A.
University of Michigan; Ann Arbor, Michigan
Arizona State University; Tempe, Arizona
Carnegie Institute Pittsburgh, Pennsylvania
Wadsworth Atheneum; Hartford, Connecticut
Elmira College; Elmira, New York
Brockton Art Center, Fuller Memorial; Brockton, Massachusetts
Ringling Museum of Art; Sarasota, Florida
Fleming Museum, University of Vermont; Burlington, Vermont
First National Bank of Chicago; Chicago, Illinois
De Porceleyne Fles; Delft, Holland
University of Connecticut; Storrs, Connecticut
Columbus Museum of Art; Columbus, Ohio
University of Notre Dame; Notre Dame, Indiana
Michael Schiavone and Sons; New Haven, Connecticut
Indiana University; Bloomington, Indiana
Smithsonian American Art Museum; Washington, D.C.
Struktuur 68NV; The Hague, Netherlands
Boston Public Library; Boston, Massachusetts
Dartmouth College; Hanover, New Hampshire
Everson Museum of Art; Syracuse, New York
Dade County Art Collection; Miami, Florida
DeCordova Museum and Sculpture Park; Lincoln, Massachusetts
Williams College Museum of Art; Williamstown, Massachusetts
George Washington University; Washington, D.C.
New Britain Museum of American Art; New Britain, Connecticut
Brooklyn Museum; Brooklyn, New York
PricewaterhouseCoopers; Hartford, Connecticut
Russell, Gibson, Von Dolen, Inc.; Farmington, Connecticut
Thiokol Corporation; Newtown, Pennsylvania
University Art Museum, State University of New York; Albany, New York
Lynch Motors; Manchester, Connecticut
Housatonic Museum of Art; Bridgeport, Connecticut
Boca Raton Museum of Art; Boca Raton, Florida
Museum of Fine Arts; Springfield, Massachusetts
Wichita State University; Wichita, Kansas
Gund Hall, Harvard University; Cambridge, Massachusetts
The Norton Company; Worcester, Massachusetts
National Trust for Historic Preservation, Nelson Rockefeller Collection; Tarrytown, New York
Harry Guggenheim Collection, Nassau County Museum of Art; Sands Point, New York
Fitchburg Art Museum; Fitchburg, Massachusetts
Ohio Wesleyan University; Delaware, Ohio
Hunter Museum of American Art; Chattanooga, Tennessee
Wilbraham & Monson Academy; Wilbraham, Massachusetts
Westmoreland Museum of American Art; Greensburg, Pennsylvania
Wondriska & Russo Associates; Farmington, Connecticut
The Woodlands, Texas
Philbrook Museum of Art; Tulsa, Oklahoma
Pfizer; New York City
Western Michigan University; Kalamazoo, Michigan
Hollister Corporation; Libertyville, Illinois
Albertus Magnus College; New Haven, Connecticut
Pepperidge Farm; New Haven, Connecticut
Olin Corporation; Cheshire, Connecticut
Manchester Community College; Manchester, Connecticut
Hartford Public Library; Hartford, Connecticut
BKM; East Hartford, Connecticut
Hartford Art School; West Hartford, Connecticut
University of Hartford; West Hartford, Connecticut
Gerwun Jewish Heritage Foundation; New Jersey
University of Connecticut Health Center; Farmington, Connecticut
Westminster School; Simsbury, Connecticut
University of New Haven; West Haven, Connecticut
James A. Michener Art Museum; Doylestown, Pennsylvania
Hartwood Acres; Pittsburgh, Pennsylvania
Gulf Coast Art Center; Belleair, Florida
Von Liebig Art Center; Naples, Florida
Picker Art Gallery, Colgate University; Hamilton, New York
Emerson Gallery, Hamilton College; Clinton, New York
Yager Museum of Art & Culture, Oneonta, New York
City of Fort Pierce; Fort Pierce, Florida
Office of Charles Moore; Owensboro, Kentucky
Frost Art Museum; Miami, Florida
Vero Beach Museum of Art; Vero Beach, Florida
University of Kentucky; Lexington, Kentucky
William Benton Museum of Art; Storrs, Connecticut
Fairfield University Art Museum; Fairfield, Connecticut
Lowe Art Museum; Coral Gables, Florida
Dubuque Museum of Art; Dubuque, Iowa
Muscatine Art Center; Muscatine, Iowa

Solo exhibitions
Source: David Hayes Art Foundation archives

2020
Sculpture in Downtown Naples, City of Naples, Naples, Florida
Sculpture in Danbury, Danbury Connecticut with CityCenter Danbury.
A Totem grows in Manchester, Town of Manchester Parks; Manchester, Connecticut
2019
Art Palm Beach art fair, West Palm Beach, Florida, via the David Hayes Art Foundation
Wallace Hall Art and Antiques Exhibition, New York City, via Garvey Rita Art and Antiques
The Ventana Series, Muscatine Art Center, Muscatine, Iowa
David Hayes Jewelry, Georgia Museum of Art; Athens, Georgia (exhibit travels)
24 Sculptures in Gainesville Parks; Gainesville, Florida
Sculptural Adornments: David Hayes Jewelry. Fairfield University Art Museum, Fairfield, Connecticut
Five large sculptures in Muscatine, Iowa; Muscatine Art in Public Places Commission.
2018
Outdoor Sculpture in downtown Winter Park, Florida; City of Winter Park, Florida
Connecticut Spring Antique Show, Hartford Armory, via Garvey Rita Art and Antiques
Art Miami New York fair at Pier 94, New York City, via Long Sharp Gallery
The Ventana Series, Swope Art Museum, Terre Haute, Indiana
Market Art & Design fair, Bridgehampton, New York, via Laurence Fine Art, East Hampton
The Ventana Series, Fort Smith Regional Art Museum, Fort Smith, Arkansas (exhibit travels)
2017
Art New York fair via ACA Galleries, New York
Art Bites, Alessandro Berni Gallery, New York City
Totem Sculpture, Anita Shapolsky Gallery, New York City
Sabrina, Memphis Brooks Museum; Memphis, Tennessee
Market Art & Design fair, Bridgehampton, New York, via Laurence Fine Art, East Hampton
Yager Art Museum: In a Modern Vein:  Contemporary Art from the Yager Museum Collection
Boston International Fine Art Show, Boston, Massachusetts via Lawrence Fine Art
Wallace Hall Art and Antiques Exhibition, New York City, via Bradbury Art & Antiques and Garvey Rita Art and Antiques
2016
Art Miami art fair at the Cynthia Corbett Gallery, Miami, Florida
Context art fair at M+V Fine Art Gallery, Miami, Florida
The Original Miami Beach Antiques Show, Miami Beach, Florida with Alpen Art & Antiques
Small Vertical Motifs, Commenoz Gallery, Key Biscayne, Florida
Art Palm Beach fair with Alpen Art & Antiques; Vail, Colorado
Straight from the Barn, Emmanoel Lavagnolli Fine Art Gallery, Wynwood, Miami, Florida
Small sculptures and gouache studies, Center For Creative Education, West Palm Beach Florida
Clio Art Fair at Ale Berni Gallery, New York City
Small Sculpture and Gouache Studies, Lowe Art Museum, Coral Gables, Florida
Art Southampton fair with Cynthia Corbett Gallery; Bridgehampton, New York
David Hayes Sculpture. The Perfect Provenance, Greenwich, Connecticut
Small Sculpture, Arte Fundamenta, Wynwood, Florida
David Hayes Sculpture, Isabella Garrucho Fine Art, Greenwhich, Connecticut
David Hayes Sculpture at the Dubuque Museum of Art; Dubuque, Iowa
Modern Sculptors of Indiana, Eskanazi Art Museum, Indiana University, Bloomington Indiana
2015
Art Wynwood fair, Cynthia Corbett Gallery; Miami, Florida
Sentinel Sculptures at the Cummer Museum and Gardens; Jacksonville, Florida
Art Miami New York Fair, Cynthia Corbett Gallery; New York City
David Hayes Sculpture at the Wichita Falls, Texas Museum of Art
David Hayes Sculptures, Project Space Gallery, SUNY College at Oneonta; Oneonta, NY
Large and Small, Hartford Public Library Gallery; Hartford, Connecticut
Art Hamptons Fair, Cynthia Corbett Gallery; Southampton, New York
Sculptures on campus, SUNY College at Oneonta; Oneonta, New York
2014
Small Sculptures and Gouache Studies, Wiregrass Museum; Dothan, Alabama
David Hayes Sculpture at the Jundt Art Museum; Spokane, Washington
Maquettes and Gouache Studies at the Housatonic Museum of Art, Bridgeport, Connecticut
Sculpture at the Springfield Museums; Springfield, Massachusetts
Recent Small Sculptures at M+V Art Gallery, Miami, Florida
Sculpture at Northwood Village; West Palm Beach, Florida
2013
David Hayes Sculpture, Contemporary Art Center; Peoria, Illinois
David Hayes: A Sculptor of Space and Nature, Elizabeth Myers Mitchell Gallery at St. John’s College; Annapolis, Maryland
Hanging Screen Sculptures at the Lutz Children’s Museum; Manchester, Connecticut
David Hayes Sculpture at the Snite Museum of Art, University of Notre Dame; Notre Dame, Indiana
Sentinel Sculptures at the Fort Wayne Museum of Art; Fort Wayne, Indiana
David Hayes Sculptures at the Wiregrass Museum; Dothan, Alabama
2012
Small sculpture, gouaches, and new Totems; Garrison Art Center, Garrison, New York
20 Sculptures at Art Museum at the University of Kentucky; Lexington, Kentucky
Sculptures at the WSU Downtown Art Gallery; Westfield, Massachusetts
Sculptures at the Governor’s Mansion, Hartford, Connecticut
2011
Sculpture at One North Broadway; White Plains, New York
Huntsville Museum of Art in conjunction with Huntsville’s Spaces Sculpture Trail
David Hayes Small Sculpture, George Waters Gallery, Elmira College; Elmira, New York
Sculpture at Goodwin College; East Hartford, Connecticut
2010
Art to the Avenue; Greenwich Avenue, Greenwich, Connecticut
Fathers & Daughters, The Greenwich Arts Council Presents In The Bendheim Gallery; Greenwich, Connecticut
Boscobel, In conjunction with the CURRENT show through Garrison Art Center
2009
The Sweeney Decade: Acquisitions At The 1959 Inaugural. Solomon R. Guggenheim Museum.
Hayes Family Show: Three Generations. White Plains Library, White Plains, New York
2008
David Hayes: 60 sculptures in White Plains, New York.
2007
Vero Beach Museum of Art; Vero Beach, Florida
Sculpture in Downtown Syracuse; Syracuse, New York
The Lauren Rogers Museum of Art; Laurel, Mississippi
Ross Art Museum at Ohio Wesleyan University; Delaware, Ohio – Small Sculptures, Drawings and Outdoor Sculpture
2006	
LSU Museum of Art; Baton Rouge, Louisiana – David Hayes Sculpture
Erie Art Museum Annex Gallery; Erie, Pennsylvania – Small Sculptures and Drawings
Longview Museum of Fine Arts; Longview, Texas – David Hayes Sculpture
2005	
Mobile Museum of Art; Mobile, Alabama – Eight Vertical Motifs
Hartwick College; Oneonta, New York – 12 Sculptures on Oyaron Hill
Krasl Art Center; St. Joseph, Michigan – Small Sculptures and Drawings
Yager Museum of Art & Culture; Oneonta, New York – Small Sculptures and Drawings
Erie Art Museum; Erie, Pennsylvania – Art Around Erie
2004	
FIU Biscayne Bay Campus; Miami, Florida – David Hayes Sculpture at Florida International University
James A. Michener Art Museum; Doylestown, Pennsylvania – David Hayes Outdoor Sculpture Installation
Fort Pierce, St. Lucie County and Core Developers, Florida – Exhibition Without Walls
2003	
Burt Reynolds Museum; Jupiter, Florida – Inaugural exhibition
Orlando, Florida – 5 Screen Sculptures at the University of Central Florida
Sculpture Garden & Studio at Gidion's; Kent, Connecticut – David Hayes Sculpture
2002	
Lyric Theater Sculpture Garden; Stuart, Florida – Outdoor Sculpture
Bradley International Airport; Windsor Locks, Connecticut – Small Sculptures
2001	
Geary Design; Naples, Florida – David Hayes Sculpture, Graham Nickson Paintings
Lyric Theater Sculpture Garden; Stuart, Florida – Outdoor Sculpture
2000	
Sasaki, Inc.; Watertown, Massachusetts; Sculpture, Maquettes, Wall Reliefs
Fordham University Downtown; New York City – Wall Sculptures and Drawings
Denise Bibro Fine Arts Inc.; New York City – David Hayes Steel Sculpture
1999	
Screen Sculpture Commission, Nicotra Group; Staten Island, New York
Colgate University; Hamilton, New York – Sculpture, Maquette Reliefs
1998	
Mercy Gallery, Loomis Chaffee School; Windsor, Connecticut – Drawings, Maquettes, Reliefs, and Screen Sculptures
City of Stamford, Connecticut and Stamford Town Center – Stamford Sculpture Walk: 59 Sculptures in Stamford, Connecticut
Tremaine Gallery, Hotchkiss School; Lakeville, Connecticut – Drawings, Maquettes, Reliefs and Polychrome Sculptures
Boca Raton Museum of Art; Boca Raton, Florida – Vertical Motifs, Drawings, Maquettes and Large Vertical Motifs
Appleton Museum of Art; Ocala, Florida – Large Vertical Motifs
Stamford Center for the Arts, Rich Forum; Stamford, Connecticut – David Hayes: Paintings, Acrylic Landscapes and Studies
Downtown Stamford and Stamford Town Center; Stamford, Connecticut – Sculpture in Stamford
1997	
100 Pearl Gallery; Hartford, Connecticut – Sculpture, Drawings and Maquettes
The Gallery, University of New Haven; West Haven, Connecticut – Sculpture and Paintings
Southern Vermont Art Center; Manchester, Vermont – Screen Sculptures
Gulf Coast Art Center; Belleair, Florida – Screen Sculptures
Orlando City Hall; Orlando, Florida – Screen Sculptures
Hines Building; Boston, Massachusetts – Five Screen Sculptures
Hayes Modern Gallery; Naples, Florida – Sculptures, Drawings and Macquettes
1996	
Prudential Center; Boston, Massachusetts – Screen Sculptures
Gulf Coast Art Center; Belleair, Florida – Screen Sculptures
The Pingry School; Martinsville, New Jersey – Sculpture, Drawings and Macquettes
1994
Anderson Gallery, Buffalo, New York – A Survey of Screen Sculptures – Sculptures, Macquettes and Drawings.
1993
Elaine Benson Gallery, Bridgehampton, New York – Screen Sculptures
1992
Gallerie Françoise; Baltimore, Maryland – David Hayes—Outdoor Sculpture
1991
Neville-Sargent Gallery; Chicago, Illinois – Sculpture, Maquettes, Drawings and Installation Photographs
1990
Indiana University Art Museum; Bloomington, Indiana – Sculpture, Maquettes and Gouaches
1989
Snite Museum of Art; University of Notre Dame, Notre Dame, Indiana – Sculpture, Maquettes and Gouaches. Exhibition travels to Indiana University Art Museum
1988
Station Plaza; Stamford, Connecticut – Outdoor Sculpture
1987
Albertus Magnus College; New Haven, Connecticut – Outdoor Sculpture and Wall Reliefs
1986
Shippee Gallery; New York City – Vertical Motif Series
1985
Visual Images Gallery; Wellfleet, Massachusetts – Sculpture, Gouaches and Small Vertical Motifs
1984
Visual Images Gallery; Wellfleet, Massachusetts – Sculpture, Gouaches, and Painted Reliefs
Shippee Gallery; New York City – Recent Sculpture and Works on Paper
1983
Wesleyan Potters; Middletown, Connecticut – Sculpture, Drawings, and Ceramics
Visual Images Gallery; Wellfleet, Massachusetts – Sculpture, Drawings, Ceramics and Small Bronzes
Rensselaer County Council for the Arts; Troy, New York – Sculpture, Drawings, and Reliefs
1982
Sunne Savage Gallery; Boston, Massachusetts – Sculpture and Drawings
Elaine Benson Gallery; Bridgehampton, New York – Sculpture and Models
Visual Images Gallery; Wellfleet, Massachusetts – Sculpture, Drawings, and Ceramics
1981
Bard College; Annandale-on-Hudson, New York – Outdoor Sculpture
Old State House; Hartford, Connecticut – Sculpture on Old State House Lawn
June 1 Gallery; Bethlehem, Connecticut – Sculpture and Drawings
Visual Images Gallery; Wellfleet, Massachusetts – Sculpture, Gouaches, Ceramics
University of Maryland, Baltimore County Campus; Catonsville, Maryland – Cross Section, Drawings, Ceramics, Tapestries, Sculpture
1980
Bethel Gallery and Bethel Library grounds; Bethel, Connecticut – Sculpture Inside/Outside
Art Museum and City of Fitchburg; Fitchburg, Massachusetts – Sculpture, Drawings, and Ceramics
Saratoga Performing Arts Center; Saratoga Springs, New York – Outdoor Sculpture
Skidmore College; Saratoga Springs, New York – Sculpture & Drawings
1979
Amherst College; Amherst, Massachusetts – Sculpture
Nassau County Museum; Sands Point, New York – Outdoor Sculpture
The Gallery, G. Fox & Co.; Hartford, Connecticut
White Mountains Center for the Arts; Jefferson, New Hampshire
Plymouth State College; Plymouth, New Hampshire
University Library, University of Connecticut; Storrs, Connecticut – Sculpture in the Library
1978
Museum of Fine Arts and City of Springfield; Springfield, Massachusetts – On Loan to Springfield: Sculpture, Ceramics, Drawings
Choate Rosemary Hall; Wallingford, Connecticut – Outdoor Sculpture
State University of New York; Albany, New York – Sculpture and Drawings
Manchester Community College; Manchester, Connecticut – Outdoor Sculpture
Dartmouth College; Hanover, New Hampshire – Sculpture on Tuck Mall
1977
Franz Bader Gallery; Washington, D.C. – Sculpture and Ceramics
George Washington University; Washington, D.C. – Outdoor Sculpture
Georgetown University Hospital; Washington, D.C. – Five Sculptures
DeCordova Museum; Lincoln, Massachusetts – Outdoor Sculpture
1976
Danbury, Connecticut – Sculpture in the City
1975
Everson Museum of Art; Syracuse, New York – Sculpture
Brockton Art Center; Fuller Memorial, Brockton, Massachusetts
1974
Copley Square and Dartmouth Street Mall; Boston, Massachusetts
Martha Jackson Gallery; New York City – Ceramics
Columbus Gallery of Fine Art; Columbus, Ohio
Sunne Savage Gallery; Boston, Massachusetts
1973
Munson Gallery; New Haven, Connecticut
Sunne Savage Gallery; Boston, Massachusetts
Albany Institute of History & Art; Albany, New York
Gallery Five East; East Hartford, Connecticut
1971
Harvard University, Hunt Hall; Cambridge, Massachusetts
New Britain Museum of American Art; New Britain, Connecticut
Agra Gallery; Washington, D.C.
1970
University of Connecticut; Storrs, Connecticut
Manchester Community College; Manchester, Connecticut
St. Joseph College; West Hartford, Connecticut
1969
Bard College; Annandale-on-Hudson, New York
Willard Gallery; New York
Arizona State University; Tempe, Arizona
1968	
Galerie De Haas; Rotterdam, Holland – Ceramics
1966	
Lyman Allen Museum; New London, Connecticut
Houston Festival of Arts; Houston, Texas
Willard Gallery; New York
David Anderson Gallery; Paris
1963	
Root Art Center, Hamilton College; Clinton, New York – Sculpture and Drawings
1962	
University of Notre Dame and Indiana University; Notre Dame and Bloomington, Indiana – Retrospective Exhibition of Sculpture and Drawing
1961	
Willard Gallery, New York City
1960	
Sharon Creative Art Foundation; Sharon, Connecticut – Two-man show with Cleve Gray
1959
Lyman Allen Museum; New London, Connecticut
Museum of Modern Art; New York – New Talent Series
1958	
Wesleyan University; Middletown, Connecticut

References

External links
Official website
"David Vincent Hayes  (1931 – )", Askart

, Museum of Modern Art archives: David V. Hayes, American, 1931–2013.
, Connecticut Sculptor David Hayes Transformed Steel into Art, Diane Orson interview on WNPR.
, Legacy List with Matt Paxton: "You Gotta Have Art."

1931 births
2013 deaths
Indiana University alumni
University of Notre Dame alumni
Harvard University staff
University of Hartford people
Artists from Hartford, Connecticut
Forma Viva Portorož
People from Coventry, Connecticut
Sculptors from Connecticut
Fulbright alumni